The 1933 Washington University Bears football team was an American football team that represented Washington University in St. Louis as a member of the Missouri Valley Conference (MVC) during the 1933 college football season. Led by second-year head coach Jimmy Conzelman, the Bears compiled an overall record of 4–5 with a mark of 1–2 in conference play, placing fourth in the MVC.

Schedule

References

Washington University
Washington University Bears football seasons
Washington University Bears football